Adebisi Shank were a three-piece instrumental rock trio from Wexford, Ireland consisting of guitarist Lar Kaye, bass guitarist Vincent McCreith and drummer Michael Roe. The band was signed to Richter Collective in Ireland, before the record label closed in December 2012, Big Scary Monsters in the United Kingdom, Sargent House in the United States and Parabolica in Japan. Their name is a reference to the Oz character Simon Adebisi. Their style of music was described as "seriously upbeat math-rocky craziness". In September 2014, the band announced their breakup, with each member pursuing different paths. They released three studio albums and one extended play in their career.

History

The band formed in August 2006, after both drummer Mick Roe and guitarist Lar Kaye, who worked together in math rock band Terrordactyl, collaborated with bass player Vinny McCreith, who at the time worked on a solo chiptune project named The Vinny Club. The group's name, which derives from the Oz character Simon Adebisi, was picked by guitarist Larry Kaye when they needed a name quickly. Not long after their formation, in July 2007, the band released their first EP, titled This is the EP of a band called Adebisi Shank. They released the EP on DIY label Armed Ambitions and this led to the band later in 2007 touring across continental Europe with Marvins Revolt.

In early 2008 they toured Japan, supporting LITE and the EP's release on their new Japanese label, Parabolica.

In 2010 they were also nominated for a Choice Music Prize and played in Vicar Street in front of a sold-out crowd. They lost to Two Door Cinema Club's debut album Tourist History.

For the release of their second album, the band signed to US label and management company Sargent House, offering North American label support and worldwide management. This signing is significant for the band as they have always had a desire to tour the United States; however, they only wanted to do it if they could find a record label to support them. Prior to the release of their second studio album, in 2010, the band played a 14-date tour across the Republic of Ireland and Northern Ireland, including festival appearances at Indiependence, Castlepalooza, Off The Cuff and Glasgowbury. In 2011 the band won Best Album, Best Rock Act and Best Design at The Digital Socket Awards 2011, a music awards show organized by Irish music bloggers.

In late 2012, Kaye revealed that he had formed an electropunk supergroup trio called No Spill Blood. The band was formed with members from other bands like Hands Up Who Wants To Die?, Elk, and Magic Pockets and released their debut EP on 31 July 2012.

Across July 2012 the band engaged on a New Tunez tour which went across Ireland, which gave the band an opportunity to debut and perform new, unreleased material.

On 18 September 2013, the band announced the completion of their upcoming third album, having released it on 12 August 2014, to positive reviews from fans and critics alike. On 24 September of the same year, the band announced they would be breaking up after a last overseas tour. The band said Kaye and McCreith would continue with the music business, with Kaye playing with his other band All Tvvins, and McCreith would be producing and mixing, as well as some work with video games and as a solo artist under the name VMC Sound. He also has plans to continue with his duo Speed of Snakes. Roe, on the other hand, is a business lecturer at Dublin music college BIMM.

Characteristics

Musical style
Adebisi Shank have a style of music described as "seriously upbeat math-rocky craziness" and have self-described themselves as robot-rock. Allmusic describes them as fusing "frenetic hardcore-influenced math rock with the epic scope of post-rock, the freewheeling intensity of heavy metal, and the dancefloor-shredding sensibilities of electronic dance music." Despite being an instrumental band the group uses distorted vocal effects in songs, treating their voices as if they are a part of their musical ensemble, with the band stating they would never use "clean vocals" in their music. The band incorporates several different instruments into their ensemble, utilising: guitars, drums, synthesizers, marimbas, horns, vocoder, percussion ensemble and "musical instruments we're not sure have even been invented yet."

The band's style has been compared to math rock bands such as Don Caballero and Battles, as well as also having their style compared to the "triumphant guitar harmonies of Fang Island with the mathematic precision of Battles, the genre-surfing playfulness of Daft Punk and churning intensity of Health." The band's influences are diverse, ranging through several different genres, including: Prince, Leonard Cohen, Radiohead, Oingo Boingo, Nirvana, Queen, Thin Lizzy, Paul Simon, Justice, Andrew WK, Jamie Lidell, Caribou, Vangelis, Steely Dan, Thomas Dolby, Arthur Russell, The Beach Boys, Smashing Pumpkins, Talking Heads, My Bloody Valentine, Fleetwood Mac, Steve Reich, Debussy, Tangerine Dream, OutKast, Lindsey Buckingham, Burt Bacharach, Le Butcherettes, The Brecker Brothers, R. Kelly, Éric Serra, Michael Jackson.

Live performances

Adebisi Shank live performances have been described typically as relentless. A significant part of both the band's image and live performances is the bass player Vincent McCreith wearing a mask. The mask covers his entire face and resembles a scarf. When asked in an interview about the purpose of the mask McCreith commented saying: "I’d hate for the band to become famous purely because of the bass players rugged good looks and deep blue eyes."

Members
 Lar Kaye – guitar (2006–2014)
 Vincent McCreith – bass guitar (2006–2014)
 Michael Roe– drums, percussion (2006–2014)

Discography

Studio albums

Extended plays

Awards and nominations

Choice Music Prize

|-
| 2011 || This is the Second Album of a band called Adebisi Shank || Irish Album of the Year 2010 || 
|-

The Digital Socket Awards

|-
| 2011 || This is the Second Album of a band called Adebisi Shank || Best Album || 
|-
| 2011 || Adebisi Shank || Best Rock Act || 
|-
| 2011 || Featured artworks, posters and website || Best Design  || 
|-

References

External links

 Official website (archived)
 

Musical groups established in 2007
Irish musical trios
Irish rock music groups
Musical groups from County Wexford
Irish experimental rock groups
Sargent House artists